Poluyamki is a rural locality (a selo) and the administrative center of Poluyamsky Selsoviet of Mikhaylovsky District, Altai Krai, Russia. The population was 841 in 2016. There are 13 streets.

Geography 
Poluyamki is located 32 km north of Mikhaylovskoye (the district's administrative centre) by road. Nazarovka is the nearest rural locality.

References 

Rural localities in Mikhaylovsky District, Altai Krai